Hoaglin is an unincorporated community in Van Wert County, in the U.S. state of Ohio.

History
A post office called Hoaglin was established in 1886, and remained in operation until 1904. Hoaglin Township derives its name from the local Hoaglin family.

References

Unincorporated communities in Van Wert County, Ohio
Unincorporated communities in Ohio
1886 establishments in Ohio
Populated places established in 1886